Joseph Steven Gantenbein (August 25, 1915 – April 20, 1993) was an American Major League Baseball infielder in Major League Baseball who played from 1939 to 1940 for the Philadelphia Athletics. Listed at 5' 9", 168 lb., Gantenbein batted and threw right handed. He was born in San Francisco.

In a two-season career, he posted a .272 batting average with eight home runs and 59 RBI in 186 games played.

He also played for six Minor league teams in parts of 10 seasons spanning 1935–1949.

Gantenbein died in Novato, California, at the age of 77.

References

1915 births
1993 deaths
Baseball players from San Francisco
Durham Bulls players
Klamath Falls Gems players
Major League Baseball infielders
Mount Airy Reds players
Philadelphia Athletics players
Salina Blue Jays players
Toronto Maple Leafs (International League) players
Minor league baseball managers